Aber Bargoed  railway station was a small railway station in the valleys north of Cardiff. Opened as Aber Bargoed by the Brecon & Merthyr Junction Railway, the station went through several changes of name before closure. Despite the similarity in the name it is not the Bargoed station now open on the line to Rhymney.

History

The station was incorporated into the Great Western Railway during the Grouping of 1923, Passing on to the Western Region of British Railways on nationalisation in 1948, it was then closed by British Railways.

The site today

The site is now partly an open space, and partly the route of the Bargoed Bypass road.

References 

 Aber Bargoed Town station on navigable O. S. map

External links 
Station Build
The reclaimed Site 

Disused railway stations in Caerphilly County Borough
Former Brecon and Merthyr Tydfil Junction Railway stations
Railway stations in Great Britain opened in 1866
Railway stations in Great Britain closed in 1869
Railway stations in Great Britain opened in 1870
Railway stations in Great Britain closed in 1962
1866 establishments in Wales
1962 disestablishments in Wales